Papnamau is a village in Chinhat block of Lucknow district, Uttar Pradesh, India. It is part of Lucknow tehsil. As of 2011, its population is 2,363, in 431 households. It is the seat of a gram panchayat.

References 

Villages in Lucknow district